Vexillum caudatum is an extinct species of sea snail, a marine gastropod mollusk, in the family Costellariidae, the ribbed miters.

References

 Marwick, J. (1931). The Tertiary Mollusca of the Gisborne District. New Zealand Geological Survey Paleontological Bulletin 13:1-177. 18: pls.

caudatum